The race behind derny is one of the 2 motor-paced racing disciplines of the annual UEC European Track Championships.

Since late 1961, private organizers of track cycling events organized championships (European Criterion or Winter championship) during the Winter months.

The sub federation for professional cycling of the UCI, the FICP organized official European championships (called Championnats d'Hiver) between 1971/72 and 1990.

Since 1995 the European Cycling Union is responsible for this event, which is no longer an event for professionals only.

In 2004 and 2010, the derny competition was cancelled for organizational reasons.

From 2019, the event is also held for woman.

Men's Medalists

Woman's Medalists

Notes

References 

 
European cycling championships
European Track Championships